The ATP Luxembourg is a defunct tennis tournament that was played on the Grand Prix tennis circuit for one year in 1984. The event was held at Kockelscheuer Sport Centre in Luxembourg and was played on indoor carpet. Ivan Lendl won the singles event while Anders Järryd and Tomáš Šmíd teamed-up to win the doubles event.

Finals

Singles

Doubles

References

External links
 ATP Luxembourg

Grand Prix tennis circuit
Carpet court tennis tournaments
Indoor tennis tournaments
Tennis tournaments in Luxembourg
ATP Tour
Defunct tennis tournaments in Europe
Defunct sports competitions in Luxembourg
1984 in Luxembourgian sport
1984 in tennis